Kant is a 1982 book by the English philosopher Roger Scruton, in which the author provides an introduction to Kant's philosophy.l, Heidegger and Wittgenstein among others.

Reception
The book has been reviewed by David Whewell and Alexander Broadie.
Roger J. Sullivan lists the book as one of the "ine brief overviews of Kant's moral theory."

References

External links

1982 non-fiction books
2001 non-fiction books
Contemporary philosophical literature
English non-fiction books
English-language books
Works by Roger Scruton
Books about Immanuel Kant